Minuscule 394 (in the Gregory-Aland numbering), δ 460 (Soden), is a Greek minuscule manuscript of the New Testament, on parchment. Dated by a colophon to the year 1330.
It was adapted for liturgical use.

Description 

The codex contains the text of the New Testament except Book of Revelation on 344 parchment leaves. It is written in one column per page, in 29 lines per page, in silver ink.

The order of books: Gospels, Acts, Catholic epistles, and Pauline epistles.

Text 

The Greek text of the codex is a representative of the Byzantine text-type. Aland placed it in Category V.

Hermann von Soden classified it to the textual family Kr. According to the Claremont Profile Method it belongs to the textual family Kr in Luke 1 and Luke 20. In Luke 10 no profile was made. It belongs to subgroup 35.

History 

The manuscript was written by Michael, a priest. The manuscript was added to the list of New Testament manuscripts by Scholz (1794-1852).
Oscar von Gebhardt saw it in 1882, C. R. Gregory in 1886.

The manuscript is currently housed at the Biblioteca Vallicelliana (EF. 17) in Rome.

See also 

 List of New Testament minuscules
 Biblical manuscript
 Textual criticism

References

Further reading 

 G. M. Bianchini, Evangeliarium quadruplex latinae versionis antiquae (Rome, 1749), Part 1, Vol. 2, p. 531f.

Greek New Testament minuscules
14th-century biblical manuscripts